Presatovir (GS-5806) is an antiviral drug which was developed as a treatment for respiratory syncytial virus. It acts as a fusion inhibitor, and has shown promising results in Phase II clinical trials.

See also 
 Palivizumab
 Lumicitabine
 Ziresovir

References 

Anti–RNA virus drugs
Antiviral drugs